Exeter by-election may refer to:

 1868 Exeter by-election
 1873 Exeter by-election
 1916 Exeter by-election
 1918 Exeter by-election